Francisco Javier Escobar Parra (June 21, 1991) is a Colombian model and the winner of the Mister World 2013 title which was held in Kent, England on November 24, 2012. He defeated 47 other challengers from around the world to earn the Mister World 2013 title.  Francisco studied Business Administration at Monroe College, NY, and is a pole vaulter.

Francisco is professional model based in New York City. He has been in many different magazines, such as Vogue, cosmopolitan, W and many more. He has been in more than 20 countries traveling as a model and doing his sport. Francisco Escobar has been in Vogue magazine four times with Bruce Weber, who is recognized as one of the best photographers in the world.

Modeling
Francisco has been modeling for more than five years. His career started by modelling. First in Singapore where he built his book. He also travelled to China, Hong Kong, and Malaysia. After being in Asia for a year, Francisco decided to try his luck in New York. He was booked with an unknown agency and few days later he modeled for and featured for Calvin Klein. Francisco participated in New York Fashion Week a couple of times.  He is currently signed with The Society Management.

Pageantry
Francisco was one of 48 contestants from around the world competing at the seventh edition of the Mr World competition. The competition consisted of a series of challenges, culminating in the Grand Final at the Kent Event Centre, Kent, UK. Although not winning any of the challenges, he placed high in four of the five, attaining second place in the Extreme Sports Challenge and a top five placement in the Multi-Media Award. Francisco was chosen as the winner at the final and named "The World's Most Desirable Man".

As Mr World, he will embark on a variety of trips around the world as a Global Ambassador, speaking at events, working on humanitarian projects, and assisting the Miss World Organisation as an official representative.

During his reign, he has traveled to the United States, Haiti, Brazil, the United Kingdom, Hungary, Ukraine, Indonesia, and his homeland Colombia.

In 2016, he was guest judge in the final Mister World 2016 beauty pageant in Southport, England.

References

External links
 Mr World Official Website
 Francisco's Facebook

Mister World winners
Living people
Colombian beauty pageant winners
1991 births
Male beauty pageant winners